Chaudhry Latif Nazar Gujjar is a Pakistani politician who had been a member of the Provincial Assembly of the Punjab from August 2018 till January 2023 and Provincial minister of Punjab from August 2022 till January 2023. He has also served as Chairman Faisalabad Development Authority (FDA) from 2nd September 2020 to 20 July 2022.

Political career
He was elected to the Provincial Assembly of the Punjab as a candidate of Pakistan Tehreek-e-Insaf from Constituency PP-114 (Faisalabad-XVIII) in 2018 Pakistani general election. He was inducted in Pervaiz Elahi cabinet on 7th August 2022. He took oath as minister of mines and minerals.

References

Living people
Pakistan Tehreek-e-Insaf MPAs (Punjab)
Year of birth missing (living people)